is a former Japanese football player. He played for Japan national team.

Club career
Kato was born in Saitama on August 1, 1957. After graduating from Osaka University of Commerce, he joined Furukawa Electric (later JEF United Ichihara) in 1980. The club won the league champions in 1985–86. The club also won 1982 and 1986 JSL Cup. However, he could not play in the game much, as he was the team's reserve goalkeeper behind Choei Sato. Kato became a regular goalkeeper in later 1980s. He retired in 1993. He played 87 games in the league.

National team career
On June 9, 1980, Kato debuted for Japan national team against Hong Kong. He played 8 games for Japan until 1981.

Coaching career
After retirement, Kato started a coaching career at JEF United Ichihara in 1994. During the 2000s, he became a goalkeeper coach for the youth team of the Japan national team. In 2006, he became a goalkeeper coach for the Japan national team. He coached Japan until the 2010 World Cup under managers Ivica Osim and Takeshi Okada. In 2011, Kato moved to Thailand and became a goalkeeper coach for Chonburi. In 2013, he also became a goalkeeper coach for the Thailand football team. He returned to Japan in 2015 and coached at the JFA Academy.

Club statistics

National team statistics

References

External links
 
 
 Japan National Football Team Database

1957 births
Living people
Osaka University of Commerce alumni
Association football people from Saitama Prefecture
Japanese footballers
Japan international footballers
Japan Soccer League players
J1 League players
JEF United Chiba players
Japanese expatriate sportspeople in Thailand
Association football goalkeepers